= Mao's Bestiary =

2021 non-fiction book by Liz P. Y. Chee

Mao's Bestiary: Medicinal Animals and Modern China
- Author: Liz P. Y. Chee
- Publisher: Duke University Press
- Publication date: 2021
- Pages: 288

Mao's Bestiary: Medicinal Animals and Modern China is a non-fiction book by Liz P. Y. Chee. Published in 2021 by Duke University Press as part of their Experimental Futures series, the book discussed the use of animals in traditional Chinese medicine, a form of alternative medicine created in China under Mao Zedong.

== General references ==
- Chen, Huaiyu (2022-01-02). "Mao's Bestiary: Medicinal Animals and Modern China: Liz P. Y. Chee, Durham, NC: Duke University Press, 2021. 276 pp. $26.95 Paper. ISBN 9781478014041". The Chinese Historical Review. 29 (1): 67–69. doi:10.1080/1547402X.2022.2050059. ISSN 1547-402X.
- Chudakova, Tatiana (2023-05-02). "Mao's Bestiary: Medicinal Animals and Modern China, written by Liz P.Y. Chee". Inner Asia. 25 (1): 162–164. doi:10.1163/22105018-02501015. ISSN 1464-8172.
- Fearnley, Lyle (2023). "Mao's Bestiary: Medicinal Animals and Modern China by Liz P. Y. Chee (review)". Journal of the History of Medicine and Allied Sciences. 78 (2): 230–231. doi:10.1093/jhmas/jrad004. ISSN 1468-4373.
- Hu, Yun (2023-12-31). "Liz P. Y. Chee, Mao's Bestiary: Medicinal Animals and Modern China". Social History of Medicine. 36 (4): 707–708. doi:10.1093/shm/hkab120. ISSN 0951-631X.
- Keck, Frédéric (February 2022). "Mao's Bestiary: Medicinal Animals and Modern China By Liz P. Y. Chee. Durham, N.C.: Duke University Press, 2021. 288 pp. ISBN: 9781478014041 (paper)". The Journal of Asian Studies. 81 (1): 158–160. doi:10.1017/S0021911821002394. ISSN 0021-9118.
- Kloos, Stephan (2022-10-02). "Mao's Bestiary: Medicinal Animals and Modern China: Liz P.Y. Chee, Durham & London: Duke University Press, 2021. 276 pp. $26.95 USD paperback. ISBN 9781478014041". East Asian Science, Technology and Society. 16 (4): 560–563. doi:10.1080/18752160.2022.2148047. ISSN 1875-2160.
- Liu, Yan (2024-03-01). "Mao's Bestiary: Medicinal Animals and Modern China". Isis. 115 (1): 208–209. doi:10.1086/728655. ISSN 0021-1753.
- Smith, Hilary A. (2022). "Mao's Bestiary: Medicinal Animals and Modern China by Liz P. Y. Chee (review)". Bulletin of the History of Medicine. 96 (2): 278–279. doi:10.1353/bhm.2022.0013. ISSN 1086-3176.
- Wahlberg, Ayo (2024-01-22). "Mao's Bestiary: Medicinal Animals and Modern China, written by Liz P. Y. Chee". Asian Medicine. 18 (1–2): 338–340. doi:10.1163/15734218-12341542. ISSN 1573-420X.
- Yi, Jongsik Christian (December 2021). "Mao's Bestiary: Medicinal Animals and Modern China. By Liz P. Y.Chee. Duke University Press. 2021. x + 276pp. £83.00 (hb). £20.99 (pb)". History. 106 (373): 871–872. doi:10.1111/1468-229X.13231. ISSN 0018-2648.
- Zhang, Peter Bo (2025-03-01). "Review: Mao's Bestiary: Medicinal Animals and Modern China , by Liz P. Y. Chee". Animal History. 1 (1): 97–98. doi:10.1525/ah.2024.2315396. ISSN 2998-3673.
